The Kasper Bekas is a family of American mid-wing, tailless gliders designed by Witold Kasper and derived from the earlier 1959 Brochocki BKB-1 design.

Design and development
The Bekas series was an attempt by Kasper to create an experimental tailless glider with a higher glide ratio, better ground handling and rigging, using a flexible wing to study the effects of wing flexing on stability and controllability in flight.

The Bekas is built from wood and covered in plywood. The wing uses a NACA 8-H-12 airfoil and has greater span and higher aspect ratio than the BKB-1 to achieve its goals. The wing features outboard trailing edge control surfaces that act both as elevator for pitch control and aileron for roll control. The landing gear is a fixed monowheel.

The design resulted in a high glide ratio for a  wingspan of 45:1, along with a reasonably low sink rate of 2.0 feet per second.

Operational history
The first Bekas, an "N" model, was built by Kasper in 1968. It was destroyed and removed from  FAA records in 1977.

Two others were completed. One model 1-A was started by Al Wilson of Seattle, Washington and completed by Clifford Johnson of Minneapolis, Minnesota in 1972, which features a wider chord wing. The final one was completed by Don Mattson of Seattle.

Variants
Bekas N
The "N" (for narrow wing) was first flown in April 1968.
Bekas 1-A
Variant with longer wing chord.

Specifications (Bekas N)

See also

References

External links
Photo of Kasper Bekas
Photo of Kasper Bekas

1960s United States sailplanes
Aircraft first flown in 1968
Tailless aircraft
Mid-wing aircraft